Upagupta (c. 3rd Century BC) was a Buddhist monk. According to some stories in the Sanskrit text Ashokavadana, he was the spiritual teacher of the Mauryan emperor Ashoka. In the Sarvāstivādin tradition he is the fifth patriarch after Mahākaśyapa, Ānanda, Madhyāntika, and Śāṇakavāsin, and in the Ch'an tradition he is regarded as the fourth.  Upagupta's teacher was Śāṇavāsa, who was a disciple of Ānanda, the Buddha's attendant. Due to the absence of his name in Theravada literature it is assumed that Upagupta was a Sarvāstivādin monk. In South East Asian countries and Bangladesh Upagupta is a great cult figure. In Myanmar he is known as Shin Upagutta. In the Lokapannatti Upagupta is sent by Ashoka to tame Mara during an enshrinement ceremony festival, afterwards he asks her to take the physical form (rupakaya) of Buddha so that everyone at the festival can see what Buddha looked like.

In literature 
Rabindranath Tagore in his poem 'Abhisar' collected in 'Katha' relates a story of Upagupta. In the story, in the month of Sraban, the monk was at sleep in Mathura, when Vasavdatta - the city's diva or courtesan trips over and notices the monk. Enchanted by the handsome appearance of the monk, Vasavdatta invites him to go with her to her house. But Upagupta tells her that he cannot go with her at this point; when time comes, he will go. After a passage of seven months, when the month of Chaitra came, the city folks went to a festival out in the forest. In the lone city, Upagupta goes beyond the precincts and finds Vasavdatta severely deformed by a disease with pustules covering her body. The city people had cast her out of the city's wall. The monk nurses the woman with care - telling her that the time for their togetherness has come.  
Rabindranath adopted the story with some changes from the Bodhisattvāvadānakalpalatā  by Kshemendra, the 10th-11th century Kashmiri poet.

In Transmission of Light, Keizan describes Upagupta as a great teacher who helped many people. "Whenever anyone attained realization, Upagupta would cast a talisman four fingers in breadth into a cave. The cave was eighteen cubits by twelve cubits, and it was filled with talismans – that is how many people attained enlightenment."

See also
Shin Upagutta

References 

 Upagupta, the Fourth Buddhist Patriarch, and High priest of Acoka
 Abhisār – Rabindranath Rabindranath Tagore’s Poetic Adaptation of an Episode from Upagupta Legend: An Example of Buddhist Narratives in the Time of Bengal Renaissance

Indian Buddhist monks
3rd-century BC people
Ancient Indian people
3rd-century BC Indian monks